Thanh Ba is a rural district (huyện) of Phú Thọ province in the Northeast region of Vietnam. As of 2003 the district had a population of 109,806. The district covers an area of 194 km2. The district capital lies at Thanh Ba.

Administrative divisions
The district consists of the district capital, Thanh Ba, and 26 communes: Đồng Xuân, Lương Lỗ, Hanh Cù, Yển Khê, Vũ Yển, Phương Lĩnh, Mạn Lạn, Hoàng Cương, Thanh Xá, Chí Tiên, Sơn Cương, Đỗ Sơn, Thanh Hà, Đông Thành, Khải Xuân, Võ Lao, Quảng Nạp, Ninh Dân, Yên Nội, Thái Ninh, Đông Lĩnh, Đại An, Năng Yên, Đỗ Xuyên, Thanh Vân and Vân Lĩnh.

References

Districts of Phú Thọ province